The Daltons (known as Les Dalton in French) is a French comedy animated television series based on the works by artist Morris and writer René Goscinny as it focuses on the four main villains of the comic book series Lucky Luke who try to escape the prison they get locked up in every time Lucky Luke captures them. The show is being adapted by Olivier Jean-Marie and Jean-François Henry while the series is directed by Charles Vaucelle.

Plot 
Prisoners of a penitentiary in the Nevada desert, the Dalton brothers try to escape from the penitentiary but without achieving their ends.

Characters

Main 
 Joe Dalton - Joe is the oldest, shortest, angriest and evilest of the Dalton brothers who is always planning a way to escape prison, but his plans usually fail. His tremendous anger stems from his hatred of Lucky Luke due to him putting them in prison multiple times.(voiced by John Mariano (Seasons 1–2) / Marc Thompson (Fort Dalton))
 Jack Dalton - Jack is the first middle of the Dalton brothers. He is quite withdrawn, attentive and calm; we discover him as a mechanical genius. (voiced by Brian Cummings (Season 1) / Tom Wayland (Fort Dalton))
 William Dalton - William is the most intelligent and cultured of the Dalton brothers. He is quite thoughtful and calm, he is also the one who solves even the most complex problems, he is even able to translate ancient texts like Nahuatl (the language of the Aztecs) and he is close to Jack. (voiced by Barry Dennen (Seasons 1–2) / Tom Wayland (Fort Dalton))
 Averell Dalton - Averell is the tallest, youngest, and dumbest of the Dalton brothers (which is a common cause of escape failures). He is sensitive and honest in spite of himself. He is very often in the moon. He is also a great foodie, however he sometimes has strokes of genius or shows himself to be very talented in certain fields (especially art), such as making trompe-l'oeil, making origami or sculptures. with just about anything: stones, soap, food. (voiced by Maurice LaMarche (Season 1–2) / Marc Thompson (Fort Dalton))
 Melvin Peabody - Melvin is the warden of the penitentiary (although most of the decisions are made by Miss Betty). He closely monitors the actions of the Dalton brothers. He is also fairly self-assured, greedy, impulsive, and he panics quite easily when the Daltons try to escape. He also has a soft spot for Miss Betty. He dreams of his penitentiary becoming famous and holding onto its reputation. It sometimes receives famous people like Thomas Edison, the Wright Brothers, Queen Victoria, Ulysses S. Grant, the Dr. Jekyll (renamed Dr. Jeffkyll), Jesse James, Charles Darwin, Henri de Toulouse-Lautrec, Antonio López de Santa Anna, etc. It also has a language twitch and replaces most suffixes with "tude", in the English dub, he has a language twitch and replaces most suffixes with an "-ism". In the episode "The Prisoner", he tells the new prisoner to call him George while his name is Melvin. (voiced by Barry Dennen (Seasons 1–2) / Darren Dunstan (Fort Dalton))
 Miss Betty - Betty is the prison host. The majority of inmates have a soft spot for her, as do Mr.  Peabody and True Falcon. She has her character and at the same time gentle and caring. She seems to have a crush on Averell Dalton. She turns out to be very skilled with anything: firearm, bow and arrow, driving, etc. (voiced by E.G. Daily (Season 1) / Eileen Stevens (Season 2))
 Rin Tin Can/Rantanplan - Rin Tin Can is the penitentiary's dimwitted watchdog. He is the only animal in the show who can talk. He seems to have a surge of affection for the Daltons and in particular Joe, whom he sees as a master. He is primarily responsible for the failures in the Dalton escapes. It is shown in the episode "The Contrary of an Indian" that he understands the opposite of what he is told, and in the episode "Inside Rantanplan" that his stupidity is due to the inactivity of his brain capacities. (voiced by Maurice LaMarche (Seasons 1–2) / Darren Dunstan (Fort Dalton))

Recurring 
 Pete and Emmett - They are the two guards at the penitentiary. They are close and not very smart. They often make bets on whether the Daltons are able to escape or not and spend more time chatting than watching them.
 Loup Cinglé - He is the chief of the Bras-Cassés tribe. He is the one who most often brings the Dalton back to the penitentiary, often with arrows in the back. Despite his appearance and calm voice, he is very touchy and impulsive.
Fabulous Falcon - a born manipulator and crook who is often fooled by the Daltons who steal personal and even magical objects from him, which can help them escape, even if he maintains a certain collaboration with them. Like Miss Betty, he is an animator at the penitentiary where he presents Native American customs and culture. He is also a sorcerer and doctor.
 Ma Dalton - Ma Dalton is the Dalton's mother. She is similar in height to Joe's (whereas in the comics she is a little taller than him). Despite her dishonesty, she attaches great importance to the politeness and good education of her children, whom she loves, especially Averell.
 Lucky Luke - Lucky Luke is a lone cowboy who shoots faster than his shadow and the hero of the series of the same name, who kept stopping the Daltons to Joe's dismay. Although he is absent from this series, he appears in the blink of an eye in some episodes. According to Mr. Peabody in the episode "The Escape For Dummies", he would have retired but note that in this same episode, Joe was furious to see him (it was Peabody disguised as Lucky Luke) because it would seem let him be responsible for their incarceration in the penitentiary.
 Ming Lee Fu - He is the Chinese penitentiary launderer. He is gifted in acupuncture, hypnosis, kung fu, etc. He lives in a pagoda which also serves as a laundry. He also has boxes of explosives that he uses to unclog the washing machine, or fireworks for Chinese New Year.

Episodes

Series overview

Season 1 (2010–2012)

Season 2 (2013–2016)

Broadcast 
The series was released on May 31, 2010. It aired on France 3 and Canal+ Family, and then on Télétoon+, France 4 and Boomerang. In India, the show is broadcast on Hungama TV and Super Hungama in English, Hindi, Tamil and Telugu languages. In Indonesia and 38 Countries the show is broadcast on Kidszone in Indonesian and Homoians Languages.

References

External links
 

2010s French animated television series
2010 French television series debuts
2016 French television series endings
2010s animated comedy television series
2010s French comedy television series
2010s prison television series
2010s Western (genre) television series
French children's animated comedy television series
France Télévisions children's television series
France Télévisions television comedy
Lucky Luke
Television series set in the 19th century
Television series based on Belgian comics
Xilam
Animated television series about brothers
Western (genre) animated television series
Deserts in fiction